Jones House may refer to:

in the United States
(by state, then city)

William C. Jones House, Eutaw, Alabama, listed on the National Register of Historic Places (NRHP)
Phelps–Jones House, Huntsville, Alabama, listed on the NRHP
Gov. Thomas G. Jones House, Montgomery, Alabama, listed on the NRHP
Wycough–Jones House, Batesville, Arkansas, listed on the NRHP
E. Fay and Gus Jones House, Fayetteville, Arkansas, listed on the NRHP
Arthur J. Jones House, Little Rock, Arkansas, listed on the NRHP in Little Rock, Arkansas
Scipio A. Jones House, Little Rock, Arkansas, listed on the NRHP in Little Rock, Arkansas
Mark P. Jones House, Searcy, Arkansas, listed on the NRHP in White County, Arkansas
Jones House (Sulphur Springs, Arkansas), listed on the NRHP
Edward L. Jones House, Paradise Valley, Arizona, listed on the NRHP in Maricopa County, Arizona
McCullagh–Jones House, Los Gatos, California, listed on the NRHP in Santa Clara County, California
Theophilus Jones House, Wallingford, Connecticut, listed on the NRHP in New Haven County, Connecticut
Enoch Jones House, Clayton, Delaware, listed on the NRHP
Justis–Jones House, Wilmington, Delaware, listed on the NRHP
Charles William Jones House, Pensacola, Florida, listed on the NRHP
Reid–Jones–Carpenter House, Augusta, Georgia, listed on then NRHP
Jones, Walter, Rock House, Good Hope, Georgia, listed on the NRHP in Walton County, Georgia
Pearl J. Jones House, Hartwell, Georgia, listed on the NRHP in Hart County, Georgia
Jones–Florence Plantation, Odessadale, Georgia, listed on the NRHP in Meriwether County, Georgia
Abe Jones House, Watkinsville, Georgia, listed on the NRHP in Oconee County, Georgia
John James Jones House, Waynesboro, Georgia, listed on the NRHP in Burke County, Georgia
Jedd Jones House, Malad City, Idaho, listed on the NRHP in Oneida County, Idaho
Jones House (Pontiac, Illinois), listed on the NRHP in Illinois
Lewis Jones House (Centerville, Indiana), listed on the NRHP
Colonel William Jones House, Gentryville, Indiana, listed on the NRHP
Margaret and George Riley Jones House, Muncie, Indiana, listed on the NRHP
Tauy Jones House, Ottawa, Kansas, listed on the NRHP in Franklin County, Kansas
Underwood–Jones House, Bowling Green, Kentucky, listed on the NRHP in Warren County, Kentucky
Jones–Willis House, Brandenburg, Kentucky, listed on the NRHP in Meade County, Kentucky
Moses Jones House, Harrodsburg, Kentucky, listed on the NRHP in Mercer County, Kentucky
Jones House (Valley Station, Kentucky), listed on the NRHP in Jefferson County, Kentucky
Jones House (Gibsland, Louisiana), listed on the NRHP in Louisiana
Wade H. Jones, Sr., House, Meeker, Louisiana, listed on the NRHP
Jones House (Melrose, Louisiana), listed on the NRHP in Natchitoches Parish, Louisiana
Jerry Jones House, Melrose, Louisiana, listed on the NRHP in Natchitoches Parish, Louisiana
John Carroll Jones House, Natchez, Louisiana, listed on the NRHP in Natchitoches Parish, Louisiana
Abel Jones House, China, Maine, listed on the NRHP in Kennebec County, Maine
Eli and Sybil Jones House, South China, Maine, listed on the NRHP in Kennebec County, Maine
Abraham Jones House, Libertytown, Maryland, listed on the NRHP
William R. Jones House, Cambridge, Massachusetts, listed on the NRHP
John Jones House (Stoneham, Massachusetts), listed on the NRHP
Thomas W. Jones House, Stoneham, Massachusetts, listed on the NRHP
Marshall W. Jones House, Winchester, Massachusetts, listed on the NRHP
Carroll Jones House, Marcellus, Michigan, listed as a Michigan State Historic site and on the NRHP
G. W. Jones House, Marcellus, Michigan, Marcellus, Michigan, listed as a Michigan State Historic site and on the NRHP
Jones–Roberts Farmstead, Lake Crystal, Minnesota, listed on the NRHP in Blue Earth County, Minnesota
Harry W. Jones House, Minneapolis, Minnesota, listed on the NRHP
Jones–Banks–Leigh House, Columbus, Mississippi, listed on the NRHP in Lowndes County, Mississippi
Dudley Jones House, Terry, Mississippi, listed on the NRHP in Hinds County, Mississippi
Lewis Jones House (Independence, Missouri), listed on the NRHP in Jackson County, Missouri
William Cuthbert Jones House, St. Louis, Missouri, listed on the NRHP in St. Louis, Missouri
Harry T. Jones House, Seward, Nebraska, listed on the NRHP in Seward County, Nebraska
Plumer–Jones Farm, Milton, New Hampshire, listed on the NRHP
John Paul Jones House, Portsmouth, New Hampshire, listed on the NRHP
Benjamin Jones House, Pemberton, New Jersey, listed on the NRHP in Burlington County, New Jersey
Everret Jones House, Santa Fe, New Mexico, listed on the NRHP in Santa Fe County, New Mexico
Samuel and Johanna Jones Farm, Amsterdam, New York, listed on the NRHP
Gen. Edward F. Jones House, Binghamton, New York, listed on the NRHP
A.D. (Boss) Jones House, Duanesburg, New York, listed on the NRHP
John W. Jones House, Elmira, New York, listed on the NRHP
George Westinghouse Jones House, Niskayuna, New York, listed on the NRHP
John Jones Homestead, Van Cortlandtville, New York, listed on the NRHP
Dr. Beverly Jones House, Bethania, North Carolina, listed on the NRHP
Jones House (Boone, North Carolina), listed on the NRHP
Nancy Jones House, Cary, North Carolina, listed on the NRHP
Hamilton C. Jones III House, Charlotte, North Carolina, listed on the NRHP
Cullen and Elizabeth Jones House, Edenton, North Carolina, listed on the NRHP
Jones–Lee House, Greenville, North Carolina, listed on the NRHP
Laurel Mill and Col. Jordan Jones House, Gupton, North Carolina, listed on the NRHP
Rev. Joshua D. Jones House, Mill Spring, North Carolina, listed on the NRHP
Jones–Jarvis House, New Bern, North Carolina, listed on the NRHP
Tisdale–Jones House, New Bern, North Carolina, listed on the NRHP
Alpheus Jones House, Raleigh, North Carolina, listed on the NRHP
Crabtree Jones House, Raleigh, North Carolina, listed on the NRHP
Jones–Wright House, Rocky Ford, North Carolina, listed on the NRHP
Jesse Fuller Jones House, Spring Green, North Carolina, listed on the NRHP
Dr. Calvin Jones House, Wake Forest, North Carolina, listed on the NRHP in Wake County, North Carolina
Jones–Bowman House, Columbiana, Ohio, listed on the NRHP
W.H. Jones Mansion, Columbus, Ohio, listed on the NRHP in Columbus, Ohio
Elijah Pelton Jones House, Findlay, Ohio, listed on the NRHP in Hancock County, Ohio
Elam Jones Public House, Hartford, Ohio, listed on the NRHP in Trumbull County, Ohio
Jones–Cutler House, Jasper, Ohio, listed on the NRHP in Pike County, Ohio
John J. Jones House, Madison, Ohio, listed on the NRHP in Lake County, Ohio
Jones–Read–Touvelle House, Wauseon, Ohio, listed on the NRHP
Charles G. Jones Farmstead, Jones, Oklahoma, listed on the NRHP in Oklahoma County, Oklahoma
Robert Lawton Jones House, Tulsa, Oklahoma, listed on the NRHP in Tulsa County, Oklahoma
Simpson E. Jones House, Bend, Oregon, listed on the NRHP
Clarence H. Jones House, Portland, Oregon, listed on the NRHP
Dr. Noble Wiley Jones House, Portland, Oregon, listed on the NRHP
Jones–Sherman House, Salem, Oregon, listed on the NRHP
Benjamin F. Jones Cottage, Cresson, Pennsylvania, listed on the NRHP
James Jones House, Greensboro, Pennsylvania, listed on the NRHP
A.C. Jones House, Batesburg, South Carolina, listed on the NRHP
Tom Jones Ranch, Midland, South Dakota, listed on the NRHP in Jackson County, South Dakota
Mack Jones House, Miller, South Dakota, listed on the NRHP in Hand County, South Dakota
Mabel and David Jones House, Watertown, South Dakota, listed on the NRHP in Codington County, South Dakota
David Jones House (Tuckaleechee Pike, Maryville, Tennessee), listed on the NRHP
David Jones House (High Street, Maryville, Tennessee), listed on the NRHP
Enoch H. Jones House, Murfreesboro, Tennessee, listed on the NRHP in Rutherford County, Tennessee
J. B. Jones House, Oak Ridge, Tennessee, listed on the NRHP
A. T. Jones House, Abilene, Texas, listed on the NRHP in Taylor County, Texas
George Washington Jones House (Bastrop, Texas), listed on the NRHP in Bastrop County, Texas
Oliver P. Jones House, Bastrop, Texas, listed on the NRHP in Bastrop County, Texas
McDougal–Jones House, Bryan, Texas, listed on the NRHP in Brazos County, Texas
J. M. Jones House, Bryan, Texas, listed on the NRHP in Brazos County, Texas
Jones House (Houston, Texas), listed on the NRHP in Brazos County, Texas
Jones–Hunt House, Houston, Texas, listed on the NRHP in Harris County, Texas
Nance–Jones House, Kingsville, Texas, listed on the NRHP in Kleberg County, Texas
Roland Jones House, Nacogdoches, Texas, listed on the NRHP in Nacogdoches County, Texas
Jones Farm (Sanger, Texas), listed on the National Register of Historic Places in Denton County, Texas
Thomas Jones House (Beaver, Utah), listed on the NRHP in Beaver County, Utah
Frederick Isaac and Mary M. Jones House, Monticello, Utah, listed on the NRHP in San Juan County, Utah
Elizabeth M. Jones House, Park City, Utah, listed on the NRHP in Summit County, Utah
David H. Jones House, Spanish Fork, Utah, listed on the NRHP
Jones Farm (Kenbridge, Virginia), listed on the NRHP
Matthew Jones House, Newport News, Virginia, listed on the NRHP
James Ellwood Jones House, Switchback, West Virginia, listed on the NRHP
Samuel S. Jones Cobblestone House, Clinton, Wisconsin, listed on the NRHP in Rock County, Wisconsin
John A. and Maggie Jones House, Columbus, Wisconsin, listed on the NRHP in Columbia County, Wisconsin
Fred B. Jones Estate, Delavan Lake, Wisconsin, listed on the NRHP
David J. and Maggie Jones House, Dodgeville, Wisconsin, listed on the National Register of Historic Places in Iowa County, Wisconsin
John H. Jones House, Janesville, Wisconsin, listed on the NRHP in Rock County, Wisconsin
Huff Jones House, Oconto, Wisconsin, listed on the NRHP in Oconto County, Wisconsin
Robert O. Jones House, Waukesha, Wisconsin, listed on the NRHP in Waukesha County, Wisconsin
Granville D. Jones House, Wausau, Wisconsin, listed on the NRHP

See also
Jones Farm (disambiguation)
David Jones House (disambiguation)
John Jones House (disambiguation)
Lewis Jones House (disambiguation)
Thomas Jones House (disambiguation)
William Jones House (disambiguation)